Damaraland was a name given to the north-central part of what later became Namibia, inhabited by the Damaras. It was bounded roughly by Ovamboland in the north, the Namib Desert in the west, the Kalahari Desert in the east, and Windhoek in the south.

In the 1970s the name Damaraland was revived for a bantustan in South West Africa (present-day Namibia), intended by the apartheid government to be a self-governing homeland for the Damara people. A centrally administered local government was created in 1980. The bantustan Damaraland was situated on the western edge of the territory that had been known as Damaraland in the 19th century.

Damaraland, like other homelands in South West Africa, was abolished in May 1989 at the start of the transition to independence.

The name Damaraland predates South African control of Namibia, and was described as "the central portion of German South West Africa" in the Encyclopædia Britannica Eleventh Edition.

See also
 Apartheid
 Bantustans in South West Africa
 Leaders of Damaraland
 Diocese of Namibia (formerly Diocese of Damaraland)

References

External links
 Vingerclip Rock Formation, Damaraland, Namibia

History of Namibia
Bantustans in South West Africa
States and territories established in 1980
States and territories disestablished in 1989
Damara people